De Huet is a suburban district near the city of Doetinchem, mostly built in the 1980s and 1990s. The district is located south-west of the city centre, and south of the Oude IJssel river.

The residential district has a lot of greenery. Apart from that, the mall de Bongerd  (roughly: the Orchard) is located within the district. De Bongerd includes community centre De Zuwe, a church De Wingerd (roughly: the Vineyard) and a former sports hall. There are also a multitude of shops throughout the district.

The district has a dedicated train station, where both Arriva and Breng operate trains in the directions of Winterswijk and Arnhem, Station Doetinchem De Huet.

Gallery

References 

Districts of Doetinchem